Vaitele Soi (born 5 August 1987, Samoa) is a retired Samoan professional boxer.

Soi has fought a few notable boxers in his career including Mohamed Azzaoui, Shane Chapman, Brad Pitt and Anthony McCracken.

The biggest fight in Soi's career was against Anthony McCracken for the WBA Pan African, WBO Asia Pacific and WBC – OPBF Cruiserweight title. Despite losing the fight by unanimous decision, Soi received a WBO Asia Pacific ranking peaking at 5th.

Professional boxing titles
World Boxing Foundation 
WBF Asia Pacific cruiserweight title (186¾ Ibs)
Samoa
Samoa National cruiserweight title (194 Ibs)
Tournament
2011 New Zealand cruiserweight Tournament winner (196¾ Ibs)
Super 8 II runner up (196¾ Ibs)

Professional boxing record

References

1987 births
Living people
Cruiserweight boxers
Samoan male boxers
Fighters trained by Lolo Heimuli